Martin Edward Reed (born July 22, 1961) is an American professional baseball coach. He is a former bullpen coach for the Atlanta Braves of Major League Baseball (MLB).

Career
Reed attended Hillsborough Community College and the University of Tampa. The California Angels selected him in the 14th round of the 1984 MLB draft. He played in Minor League Baseball through 1988 before retiring.

Reed served as an assistant coach at the University of Tampa from 1990 through 1996. He became the head coach of the Pfeiffer University baseball team, serving in the role through 1999. Reed then joined the Los Angeles Dodgers organization as the pitching coach for the Vero Beach Dodgers from 2000 and 2001, the Jacksonville Suns from 2002 through 2004, Vero Beach in 2005, and then as the Dodgers' minor league pitching coordinator from 2006 through 2008. In 2009, Reed joined the Braves' organization as the pitching coach for the Mississippi Braves. From 2011 through May 2016, he served as the pitching coach for the Gwinnett Braves, before he was promoted to the major leagues as the Braves' bullpen coach.

References

External links

1961 births
Living people
American expatriate baseball players in Canada
Atlanta Braves coaches
Baseball coaches from Massachusetts
Baseball players from Massachusetts
Baseball pitchers
Edmonton Trappers players
Kinston Eagles players
Major League Baseball bullpen coaches
Midland Angels players
Minor league baseball coaches
Peoria Chiefs players
Pfeiffer Falcons baseball coaches
Redwood Pioneers players
Sportspeople from Boston
Tampa Spartans baseball coaches
Tampa Spartans baseball players